Reynold 'Rey' Lee-Lo (born 28 February 1986) is a rugby union player who usually plays as a midfield back for Counties Manukau in the ITM Cup. In 2011 he was part of the  Development squad and he joined the Hurricanes for the 2013 Super Rugby season.

Lee-Lo was born in Vailima, a village 4 km south of the capital city of Apia. He returned to Samoa with his parents as a 5-year-old and a 7-year-old before settling in Auckland at the age of 13 when his parents returned.

In October 2014, Lee-Lo was named in the Samoa national team's squad for their 2014 European tour. He made his debut during the tour, starting at centre against Canada on 14 November.

References

External links

1986 births
New Zealand rugby union players
Samoa international rugby union players
Hurricanes (rugby union) players
Counties Manukau rugby union players
Crusaders (rugby union) players
Rugby union centres
Samoan emigrants to New Zealand
Sportspeople from Apia
Living people
Cardiff Rugby players
Expatriate rugby union players in Wales
New Zealand expatriate sportspeople in Wales